Keiler is a German river icebreaker.

Keiler may also refer to:

People
Keiler García (born 1990), Cuban footballer
Ralph Keiler (1613–1672), founding settler of Norwalk, Connecticut
Barbara Keiler (born 1953), American author
Roland Kaiser (born Roland Keiler in 1952), schlager singer-songwriter from Germany

Other uses
 Keiler (mine flail), a mine-clearing vehicle

See also
Garrison Keillor